Richard Edwin Bradford Jr. (November 10, 1934 – March 22, 2016) was an American actor. He is best known for his leading role in the television series Man in a Suitcase (1967–1968) and supporting role in the film The Untouchables (1987).

Early life
Bradford was born in Tyler, Texas, the son of Rose and Richard Edwin Bradford. His stepfather was a wholesale grocer. Raised by his grandparents in Conroe, Bradford received his schooling in San Antonio, Texas, then attended Texas A&M on a football scholarship.

When an injury short-circuited Bradford's budding athletic career, and a switch to baseball at Texas State University was stymied due to insufficient semester hours, Bradford finally decided to seriously pursue a long-contemplated career in acting. To this end he made his way to New York.

Career
Supporting himself by waiting tables, Bradford studied acting, first with Frank Corsaro, and finally, in 1962, was admitted to the Actors Studio, where he studied for two years, leading to roles in Studio productions such as Mother Courage (1963), June Havoc's Marathon '33 (1963), and Blues for Mister Charlie (1964). Also, he understudied Rod Steiger in the touring production of A.E. Hotchner's A Short, Happy Life (1961), an ostensibly Broadway-bound show which folded out of town.

Bradford's work caught the eye of another Actors Studio member, director Arthur Penn, who cast Bradford in The Chase (1966),. This work, in turn, attracted the attention of media impresario Lew Grade, who brought Bradford to Great Britain in 1967 for Man in a Suitcase.

In addition to his numerous TV appearances, Bradford has been featured in many films, such as The Missouri Breaks (1976), An Enemy of the People (1978), Badge of the Assassin (1985), The Trip to Bountiful (1985), The Untouchables (1987), and The Milagro Beanfield War (1988), but arguably his best known film role is the corrupt police captain in the 1997 film Hoodlum. Bradford appeared in the 1989 film Heart of Dixie and had notable turns in Costa-Gavras' Missing (1982), The Mean Season (1985) and The Crossing Guard (1995). 

In the 1960s, he appeared in one episode of the television series Gunsmoke and guest-starred in an episode of The High Chaparral. In the 1970s, he played Lutie Bascomb in one episode of The Waltons. He guest-starred in an episode of Murder, She Wrote in the 1980s. He also guest-starred on Viper. In 1987, he starred in the miniseries Amerika. In the mid 1980s, he was  a semi-regular cast member of the series Cagney & Lacey.

Personal life
Bradford was married to ballet dancer Eileen Elliott from 1965 to 1984. He had a son, Richard Bradford III.

He died on March 22, 2016, at the age of 81 in Los Angeles.

Miscellaneous

In 1986, The Smiths used a photograph of Bradford on the cover of their single "Panic". 

In 2004, Bradford gave a series of interviews and commentaries for a DVD release of Man in a Suitcase, expressing mild surprise at the ongoing popularity of the series today.

Selected filmography

 The Chase (1966) as Damon Fuller
 To Chase a Million (1967) as McGill
 Operation Heartbeat (1969, TV movie) as Dr. Joseph Gannon
 The High Chaparral  (1970 - It Takes a Smart Man) as 'Tulsa Red'
 Mannix (1973 - The Danford File ) as Barney Edmonds
 The Missouri Breaks (1976) as Pete Marker
 An Enemy of the People (1978) as Captain Forster
 Goin' South (1978) as Sheriff Andrew Kyle
 More American Graffiti (1979) as Major Creech
 A Rumor of War (1980, TV miniseries) as General Merle Rupert
 Missing (1982) as Andrew Babcock
 Hammett (1982) as Detective Bradford
 The Escape Artist (1982) as Sam, City Treasurer (uncredited)
 Lookin' to Get Out (1982) as Bernie Gold
 Running Hot (1984) as Tom Bond
 The Mean Season (1985) as Phil Wilson
 The Legend of Billie Jean (1985) as Pyatt
 Badge of the Assassin (1985) as L.J. Delsa
 The Trip To Bountiful (1985) as Sheriff
 Amerika (1987, TV miniseries) as Ward Milford
 The Untouchables (1987) as Police Chief Mike Dorsett
 The Milagro Beanfield War (1988) as Ladd Devine
 Little Nikita (1988) as Konstantin Karpov
 Permanent Record (1988) as Leo Verdell
 Sunset (1988) as Captain Blackworth
 Wildfire (1988) as Gene
 Heart of Dixie (1989) as Judge Claibourne
 Night Game (1989) as Nelson
 Internal Affairs (1990) as Captain Grieb
 Servants of Twilight (1991) as Henry Rankin
 Ambition (1991) as Jordan
 Cold Heaven (1991) as Monsignor Cassidy
 Under Cover of Darkness (1992) as Nathan Franklin
 Dr. Giggles (1992) as Officer Hank Magruder
 Arctic Blue (1993) as Wilder
 When a Man Loves a Woman (1994) as Angry Man Watching TV (uncredited)
 Indictment: The McMartin Trial (1995) as Los Angeles District Attorney Ira Reiner
 Steal Big Steal Little (1995) as Nick Zingaro, Hood From Chicago
 The Crossing Guard (1995) as Stuart Booth
 The Chamber (1996) - Wyn Lettner
 Hoodlum (1997) as Captain Jack Foley
 Just the Ticket (1999) as Benny Moran
 The Man from Elysian Fields (2001) as Edward Rodgers
 Hawaiian Gardens (2001) as Bruno
 The Lost City (2005) as Don Donoso Fellove

References

External links
 
 

1934 births
2016 deaths
American expatriate male actors in the United Kingdom
American male film actors
American male television actors
Male actors from Texas
People from Tyler, Texas
Texas A&M University alumni